Gurovo is a rural locality (a khutor) and the administrative center of Gurovskoye Rural Settlement, Olkhovsky District, Volgograd Oblast, Russia. The population was 539 as of 2010. There are 7 streets.

Geography 
Gurovo is located in steppe, on the Olkhovka River, 28 km northwest of Olkhovka (the district's administrative centre) by road. Kireyevo is the nearest rural locality.

References 

Rural localities in Olkhovsky District